Landing at Low Tide is an 1896 British short black-and-white silent comedy film, produced and directed by Birt Acres for exhibition on Robert W. Paul's peep show Kinetoscopes, featuring a lady falling into the water as she is helped from a small boat. The film was considered lost until footage from an 1896 Fairground Programme, originally shown in a portable booth at Hull Fair by Midlands photographer George Williams, donated to the National Fairground Archive was identified as being from this film.

Current status
Given its age, this short film is available to freely download from the Internet.

References

External links 
 

1890s British films
British black-and-white films
British silent short films
1896 comedy films
1896 films
Films directed by Birt Acres
1890s rediscovered films
British comedy short films
Rediscovered British films
1896 short films
Silent comedy films
Films set on boats